Jarosław Rębiewski (born 27 February 1974 in Łódź) is a Polish cyclist who rides for .

Major results

1999
 7th Overall Tour de Serbie
 9th Overall Szlakiem Grodów Piastowskich
2000
 10th Overall Bałtyk–Karkonosze Tour
 10th GP Ostrowca Swietokrzyskiego
2001
 7th Overall Tour of Slovenia
 7th Overall Bałtyk–Karkonosze Tour
2002
 4th Wyścig Kolarski o Puchar Trzech Miast
2003
 1st GP Weltour
 1st Stage 2a (ITT) 4 Asy Fiata Autopoland
 3rd Pasmem Gór Świętokrzyskich
 4th Wyścig Kolarski o Puchar Trzech Miast
2004
 1st Stage 6 Bałtyk–Karkonosze Tour
 7th Memoriał Henryka Łasaka
2005
 Tour of Bulgaria
1st Stages 2a (TTT) & 4a
 3rd National Time Trial Championships
 9th Overall Dookoła Mazowsza
2006
 1st Prologue (ITT) Bałtyk–Karkonosze Tour
 3rd National Time Trial Championships
 5th Pomorski Klasyk
 8th Overall Dookoła Mazowsza
 9th EOS Tallinn GP
 9th Szlakiem Walk Majora Hubala
2007
 2nd National Time Trial Championships
 5th Overall Course de la Solidarité Olympique
 5th Overall Dookoła Mazowsza
 10th Overall Szlakiem Walk Majora Hubala
2008
 1st Stage 7 Bałtyk–Karkonosze Tour
 1st Stage 4 (ITT) Tour of Małopolska
 6th Overall Circuit des Ardennes
 8th Overall Szlakiem Grodów Piastowskich
 8th Puchar Ministra Obrony Narodowej
 10th Overall Course de la Solidarité Olympique
2009
 8th Overall Dookoła Mazowsza
2012
 7th Overall Dookoła Mazowsza
2013
 9th Memoriał Henryka Łasaka
2014
 5th Overall Memorial Grundmanna I Wizowskiego

References

1974 births
Living people
Polish male cyclists
Sportspeople from Łódź